is a former Japanese football player.

Playing career
Sasahara was born in Kagoshima Prefecture on April 2, 1974. After graduating from National Institute of Fitness and Sports in Kanoya, he joined Japan Football League club Honda in 1997. Although he played 1 match in 1997, he played many matches in 1998. In 1999, he moved to newly was promoted to J2 League club, Kawasaki Frontale. However he could hardly play in the match behind Takeshi Urakami until 2000. In 2001, he played many matches instead Urakami who got hurt. He retired end of 2001 season. In 2004, when he coached at J2 club Sagan Tosu, he came back as player. However he did not play at all in the match and his registration was canceled in May.

Coaching career
In 2004, Sasahara became a goalkeeper coach at Sagan Tosu. He coached until 2008 season. In 2010, he signed with Ehime FC and coached until 2012. In 2013, he moved to Montedio Yamagata and coached until 2015.

Club statistics

References

External links

1974 births
Living people
National Institute of Fitness and Sports in Kanoya alumni
Association football people from Kagoshima Prefecture
Japanese footballers
J1 League players
J2 League players
Japan Football League (1992–1998) players
Honda FC players
Kawasaki Frontale players
Sagan Tosu players
Association football goalkeepers